Mount Herard is a high and prominent mountain summit in the Sangre de Cristo Range of the Rocky Mountains of North America.

Mountain
Originally called Medano Peak, the mountain with seven separate summits was renamed Mount Seven at the request of the Colorado Mountain Club in 1970. In 1984 the mountain's name was changed to honor Ulysses Herard who homesteaded on its slopes in 1876.

Historical names
Herard Peak 
Medano Peak 
Mount Cleveland
Mount Herard – 1984 
Mount Seven – 1970 
XL Mountain

See also

List of mountain peaks of North America
List of mountain peaks of the United States
List of mountain peaks of Colorado

References

External links

Herard
Herard
Great Sand Dunes National Park and Preserve
Herard
Herard